The following is a list of commercial operators of the Boeing 787 Dreamliner.

Airline operators
There were 865 Boeing 787 aircraft in airline service , comprising 353 787-8s, 477 787-9s and 35 787-10s. The largest operators at that time were All Nippon Airways (74), United Airlines (64), American Airlines (50), Japan Airlines (47), Etihad Airways (39), Hainan Airlines (38), Air Canada (37), Qatar Airways (37), British Airways (35), Air India (27), Ethiopian Airlines (27), and other airlines operating fewer numbers of the type.

*Data as of February 2023.

See also
List of Airbus A350 operators
List of Boeing 767 operators
List of Boeing 777 operators

Notes

References

787
Boeing 787 Dreamliner